Manor Solomon (born ) is an Israeli professional footballer who plays as an attacking midfielder or as a winger for English  club Fulham, on loan from Ukrainian Premier League club Shakhtar Donetsk, and the Israel national team.

Early and personal life
Solomon was born and raised in Kfar Saba, Israel, to an Israeli family of Ashkenazi Jewish (Hungarian-Jewish) descent and of both Sephardi Jewish and Mizrahi Jewish (Iraqi-Jewish) descent. His parents Ayala and Yossi Solomon are physical education teachers. His mother and father met while studying together at the Ohalo College, both majored in physical education and minored in maritime. As a young married couple, their shared maritime training gave them the idea to choose the unique Hebrew first name Manor for their son, that also means "a boom" in sailing. Solomon was enlisted for mandatory military service in December 2017, and has served in the Israel Defense Forces (IDF).

He also holds a Portuguese passport, on account of his Sephardi Jewish ancestry, which eases the move to certain European football leagues.

He has been in a relationship with his Israeli girlfriend Dana Voshina since 2018.

Club career

Maccabi Petah Tikva
On 26 November 2016, at the age of 17, Solomon made his senior debut for the Israeli Premier League club Maccabi Petah Tikva, coming on as a 54th minute substitute against Hapoel Haifa that ended in a 2–1 away loss. On 28 January 2017, Solomon scored his first Israeli Premier League goal a 2–0 home victory against Bnei Yehuda Tel Aviv.

Solomon was named in the "50 for the Future: UEFA.com's Ones to Watch for 2018–19".

Shakhtar Donetsk
On 11 January 2019, Ukrainian side Shakhtar Donetsk signed 19-year-old Solomon from Israeli side Maccabi Petah Tikva in a transfer worth an initial €6 million, then the fifth-highest transfer fee for an Israeli footballer. 

After moving to Shakhtar Donetsk, Solomon scored his first UEFA Champions League goal on 1 October 2019, in the 95th minute of an away match against Italian side Atalanta that ended in a 2–1 victory. This made him the youngest Israeli footballer ever to score in the Champions League, at the age of 20. On 26 November, he scored the equalising goal in a 1–1 Champions League draw away at Manchester City.

Solomon continued his good Champions League form in the following season, scoring Shakhtar's third goal on 21 October 2020 in a 3–2 away victory over Spanish side Real Madrid. On 1 December, he scored the second goal in the return fixture against Real Madrid, helping his team to a 2–0 home victory.

He celebrated both his first and second braces in back-to-back Ukrainian Premier League matches, the first on 14 March 2021 in a 4–0 home victory over Desna Chernihiv⁣ and the second on 21 March in a 3–2 defeat away to Lviv.

Fulham
On 25 July 2022, English Premier League club Fulham announced the signing of Solomon on a one-year loan, following a FIFA ruling concerning the Russian-Ukrainian War which allows foreign players affected by the war to suspend their contracts with Ukrainian clubs until 30 June 2023. Solomon started training with Fulham on 10 July, and became a registered player for the club on 1 August. Upon his signing, he became the top-paid Israeli footballer, earning £1.7 million per season, with performance bonuses that can increase his salary to £2.5 million.

He made his debut on 6 August, coming on as a substitute in the second half of a 2–2 home draw against Liverpool. On 7 January 2023, having recovered from a knee injury, he made his FA Cup debut for the club during their third round 2–0 away victory over Hull City, coming on as a second-half substitute. On 11 February, Solomon scored his first goal for the club, coming on as a 72nd minute substitute in their English Premier League match against Nottingham Forest, securing his team a 2–0 home win. On 18 February, in the following league week, Solomon netted a late winning goal in Fulham's 1–0 away victory over Brighton and Hove Albion. On 24 February he scored his third consecutive goal after coming on as a substitute, notching the equaliser in a 1–1 draw at home against Wolves.  He became the first Israeli to have scored in three consecutive English Premier League matches since Ronny Rosenthal in 1992. On 28 February he scored his fourth consecutive goal in a 2–0 FA Cup victory over Leeds. On 6 March 2023 he scored his fifth consecutive goal in a 3-2 away defeat to Brentford.

International career 
At youth international level, Solomon was capped 29 times and scored twice for his native Israel.

On 21 May 2017, at 17 years of age, Solomon was called up to the Israeli senior side, although he did not appear for the team at the time. On 7 September 2018, Solomon made his senior debut for the Israeli squad at age 19, coming on as a 71st minute substitute in a 2018–19 UEFA Nations League away match against Albania that ended in a 0–1 away loss.

On 18 November 2020, Solomon scored a first half goal for Israel in the 2020–21 UEFA Nations League in a 1–0 home victory over Scotland.

On 4 September 2021, he scored again in a 5–2 home victory over Austria in 2022 World Cup qualifying.

On 10 June 2022, during a 2022–23 UEFA Nations League away match against Albania, Solomon scored a brace, bringing Israel back from a 0–1 deficit to a 2–1 win in just 16 minutes.

Career statistics

Club

International 

Scores and results list Israel's goal tally first, score column indicates score after each Solomon goal.

Honours 
Shakhtar Donetsk
 Ukrainian Premier League: 2018–19, 2019–20, 2021–22
 Ukrainian Cup: 2018–19
 Ukrainian Super Cup: 2021

See also

List of Jewish footballers
List of Jews in sports
List of Israelis

References

External links

 
 Manor Solomon at PlaymakerStats.com
 
 
 Manor Solomon at FoxSports.com
 UEFA.com: 50 for the future: UEFA's ones to watch for 2018/19 | UEFA Champions League, 24 July 2018
 Forbes.co.il: Manor Solomon – Forbes 30 Under 30, March 2021

1999 births
Living people
Israeli Ashkenazi Jews
Israeli Sephardi Jews
Israeli Mizrahi Jews
Portuguese Jews
Israeli people of Hungarian-Jewish descent
Israeli people of Iraqi-Jewish descent
Citizens of Portugal through descent
Jewish footballers
Israeli footballers
Israel international footballers
Israel under-21 international footballers
Israel youth international footballers
Portuguese footballers
Association football midfielders
Association football wingers
Maccabi Petah Tikva F.C. players
FC Shakhtar Donetsk players
Fulham F.C. players
Israeli Premier League players
Ukrainian Premier League players
Premier League players
Footballers from Kfar Saba
Israeli expatriate footballers
Portuguese expatriate footballers
Expatriate footballers in Ukraine
Israeli expatriate sportspeople in Ukraine
Portuguese expatriate sportspeople in Ukraine
Expatriate footballers in England
Israeli expatriate sportspeople in England
Portuguese expatriate sportspeople in England